Douglas M. Peers FRHS is a Canadian historian who specializes in the history of the British Empire. He is a fellow of the Royal Historical Society since 1993 and Dean of Arts at the University of Waterloo, 2011-2018.

Selected publications

Edited
 Warfare and Empire. An Expanding World: the European Impact on World History, 1450-1800 series. Johns Hopkins, Baltimore, and Variorum, London, 1997.
 J.S. Mill’s Encounter with India. University of Toronto Press, Toronto, 1999. (With Martin Moir and Lynn Zastoupil)
 Negotiating India in the Nineteenth Century Media. Macmillan, London, 2000. (With David Finkelstein)
  India and the British Empire. The Oxford History of the British Empire Companion Series. Oxford University Press, Oxford, 2012. (With Nandini Gooptu)

Authored
 Between Mars and Mammon: Colonial Armies and the Garrison State in India, 1819-1835. I.B. Tauris, London, 1995.
 India under Colonial Rule: 1700-1885. Longman, London, 2006.

References

External links
 https://www.researchgate.net/scientific-contributions/Douglas-M-Peers-2002903535
 http://worldcat.org/identities/lccn-n96012110/

Living people
Fellows of the Royal Historical Society
Alumni of King's College London
Academic staff of the University of Waterloo
University of Calgary alumni
Historians of the British Empire
Canadian historians
Academic staff of the University of Calgary
20th-century Canadian non-fiction writers
20th-century Canadian male writers
21st-century Canadian non-fiction writers
21st-century Canadian male writers
Canadian male non-fiction writers
Year of birth missing (living people)